Puning Temple is a Buddhist temple located on Mount Wu'an in Yushan County, Jiangxi, China.

History
The temple was first established between 668 and 670, under the Tang dynasty (618–907). It was converted from the private residence donated by painter and official Yan Liben.

The temple had reached unprecedented heyday in the Song dynasty (960–1279), during that time, it was about 30 mu in size with over 100 rooms and halls, and included 160 monks.

After Song dynasty, the temple declined and was incredibly disappeared during the late Yuan dynasty (1271–1368).

Puning Temple was restored in 1822, in the reign of Daoguang Emperor in the Qing dynasty (1644–1911).

In 1924, Puning Temple became collapsed for neglect. Then Abbot Fasen rebuilt it.

In 1933, in order to built the Zhejiang–Jiangxi railway, the government demolished the Middle Hall.

In 1942, Puning Temple turned to ashes by a devastating fire during the Japanese invasion of the Second Sino-Japanese War.

Architecture
Now the existing main buildings include Shanmen, Heavenly Kings Hall, Mahavira Hall, Buddhist Texts Library and the Tomb of Yan Liben.

Gallery

References

Buddhist temples in Jiangxi
Buildings and structures in Shangrao
Tourist attractions in Shangrao
1994 establishments in China
20th-century Buddhist temples
Religious buildings and structures completed in 1994